Point Molate Marsh is a salt marsh on the western shoreline of the San Pablo Peninsula in Richmond, California. The area is environmentally valuable land as it is largely untouched and isolated from nearby urban development. The marsh was once used as a Chinese shrimp camp. It is habitat to important endangered species, especially the Ridgway's rail and salt marsh harvest mouse. Harbor seals also make use of the marsh which is on San Francisco Bay. It is located between Point San Pablo and Point Molate.

References

Landforms of Contra Costa County, California
Geography of Richmond, California
Wetlands of the San Francisco Bay Area
Marshes of California